Andrea Losco (born 31 March 1951, Cardito) is an Italian politician. He was a member of the European Parliament from 8 May 2006, when he took up a seat vacated after the 2006 Italian general election, until the 2009 European elections. He represented the Olive Tree coalition within the ALDE parliamentary group.

References

1951 births
Living people
Presidents of Campania
Democratic Party (Italy) MEPs
MEPs for Italy 2004–2009
21st-century Italian politicians